Harry Hamlet East  (April 12, 1862 – June 1, 1905) was an American professional baseball player who played in one game at third base for the Baltimore Orioles of the American Association in 1882. A St. Louis native, he was hitless in four at bats as the Orioles lost 10–5 to the St. Louis Browns at Sportsman's Park. He played two seasons of Minor league baseball as well, then became a doctor. After being admitted to a hospital with melancholia in 1905, East slit his throat with a straight razor, committing suicide at the age of 43.

Early life
Harry Hamlet East was born on April 12, 1862. Frank Russo, in his 2014 book The Cooperstown Chronicles, lists East's birthplace as St. Louis, Missouri, where the ballplayer would spend most of his life. However, Baseball-Reference.com says he was born in Decatur, Illinois. His parents were William H. East and Ada Virginia Finnegin East. Growing up, Harry was interested in baseball as well as becoming a doctor.

Baltimore Orioles

East's only Major League Baseball (MLB) game came on June 17, 1882, at Sportsman's Park in St. Louis, though he played for the visiting Baltimore Orioles as they competed against the St. Louis Browns of the fledgling American Association. He played third base in the contest, batting and throwing left-handed. East was hitless in four at bats as the Browns won 10–5.

Minor league baseball
East also played at least two seasons of Minor League Baseball. He played for the Memphis Reds of the Southern League in 1885. In 12 games (45 at bats), he recorded nine runs scored and 12 hits. All but one of the hits were singles; the other was a double. He batted .267, with a slugging percentage of .289. In 1886, East played for the Lincoln Tree Planters of the Western League, though statistics from this season are unavailable. Following his time with Lincoln, he continued to play semipro baseball through 1889, after which he decided to become a doctor.

Later years
In 1890, East enrolled at Barnes Medical College in St. Louis. After graduating, he remained in St. Louis. "By all accounts, he had a thriving practice," writes Russo.

East checked into the Alexian Brothers' Hospital as a melancholia patient in May 1905. On June 2, he committed suicide, using a straight razor to slit his throat. Orderlies discovered him too late to prevent his death. He was buried a few days later in the International Order of Odd Fellows (IOOF) Cemetery in Xenia, Illinois.

References

External links

1862 births
1905 deaths
Baltimore Orioles (AA) players
Major League Baseball third basemen
Baseball players from St. Louis
Memphis Reds players
Lincoln Tree Planters players
19th-century baseball players
Suicides by sharp instrument in the United States